Mouth and genital ulcers with inflamed cartilage syndrome (also known as "MAGIC syndrome") is a cutaneous condition with features of both Behçet's disease and relapsing polychondritis. Recently, it has been questioned whether these two conditions are linked in the same individual or are two separate disorders.

See also 
 Cartilage
 Nicolau–Balus syndrome
 List of cutaneous conditions

References

External links 

Connective tissue diseases
Syndromes